Shahrak-e Hamzeh may refer to:
 Shahrak-e Hamzeh, Ilam
 Shahrak-e Hamzeh, Choghamish, Dezful County, Khuzestan Province
 Shahrak-e Hamzeh, Sardasht, Dezful County, Khuzestan Province

See also
 Hamzeh (disambiguation)